Alavese is an extinct dialect of the Basque language spoken formerly in Álava, one of the provinces of the Basque Country of Spain. The modern-day communities of Aramaio and Legutio along the northern border with Biscay do not speak the Alavese dialect but a variant of the Biscayan dialect instead and while overall some 25% of people in Álava today are Basque speakers, the majority of these are speakers of Standard Basque who acquired Basque via the education system or moved there from other parts of the Basque Country.

Classification and features
In 1997, Professor Koldo Zuazo published research carried out on scattered recorded evidence and papers drawn up especially by Koldo Mitxelena. He  outlines three main linguistic areas running north to south, where features related to Western and Navarrese dialects mix up to different degrees according to their geographical position.

His work focuses mainly on relevant lexico-morphological differences, such as instrumental declension marks -gaz/rekin, ablative -rean/tik, barria/berria (= 'new'), elexea/elizea (= 'church'), padura/madura (= 'swamp').

Attestation

The Alavese dialect is not well attested. Substrate terms in Alavese Spanish and a handful of terms found on Basque funeral steles aside, up until 2004 the only sources were a 16th century vocabulary written by the Italian Nicolao Landuchio in 1562 in Vitoria-Gasteiz entitled Dictionarium linguae cantabricae - Bocabularioa ezqueraz jaquiteco eta ezqueraz verba eguiteco and the 1596 Doctrina Christiana en Romanze y Basquenze by Joan Perez Betolatza from Betolaza.

Pottery shards with apparently Basque inscriptions discovered at an archeological dig in Iruña-Veleia west of Vitoria-Gasteiz unfortunately were later discovered to be forgeries.

The Lazarraga manuscript which was discovered in 2004 is to date the only known piece of prose written in the Alavese dialect.

See also
Basque dialects

Notes

References

Álava
Basque dialects
Extinct languages of Europe